Hajjiabad (also Romanized as Ḩājjīābād) is a village in Mahmudabad Rural District, in the Central District of Shahin Dezh County, West Azerbaijan Province, Iran. At the 2006 census, its population was 808, in 166 families.

References 

Populated places in Shahin Dezh County